Harry Johan Carl Siefert (3 October 1910 – 10 October 1965) was a Danish long-distance runner. He competed in the men's 5000 metres at the 1936 Summer Olympics.

References

External links
 

1910 births
1965 deaths
Athletes (track and field) at the 1936 Summer Olympics
Danish male long-distance runners
Olympic athletes of Denmark
Place of birth missing